Ripalta Cremasca is a comune (municipality) in the Province of Cremona in the Italian region Lombardy, located about  southeast of Milan and about  northwest of Cremona.

Ripalta Cremasca borders the following municipalities: Capergnanica, Credera Rubbiano, Crema, Madignano, Moscazzano, Ripalta Arpina, Ripalta Guerina.

References

Cities and towns in Lombardy